Auguste Jean Marie Guenepin (17 June 1780 – 5 March 1842) was a French architect.

Guenepin was born and died in Paris. He was the son of Étienne François Edmé Guenepin (1752-24 December 1827) and Marie Madeleine Delfau (1753–1808) and Aimée Desenne's husband.

In 1805, he won the Grand Prix de Rome for architecture. In 1833, he was appointed at the Institut de France (Académie des Beaux-Arts).

Main works
 Slaughterhouse of Montmartre
 Chapel of L'Île-Saint-Denis
 Church of Noisy-le-Sec
 Restoration of the Abbey of Saint-Germain-des-Prés in Paris
 Restoration of the Sainte-Anne chapel of Notre-Dame de Paris

References

1780 births
1842 deaths
19th-century French architects
Architects from Paris
Prix de Rome for architecture
École des Beaux-Arts alumni
Members of the Académie des beaux-arts
Chevaliers of the Légion d'honneur